Ifeanyi Onyeabo   (1971–2019), was a Nigerian filmmaker.  He is most notable for the films My Mother’s Heart, 5 Apostles, Darkest Knight and One Good Turn.

Along with his partner Steve James, he established the production company, SIC Entertainment Production Nigeria Limited. He was awarded at African movie Academy Award (AMAA) for his movie New Jerusalem.

In July 2014, Onyeabor was remanded in Kirikiri Maximum Prisons by the Lagos High Court sitting in Ikeja over an alleged N8.8 million fraud. According to sources, he has collected a total sum of N8.8 million from Steve-James in December 2008, with the purpose of producing two movies; Young Amazon and Tribes.

Onyeabor died while filming in Jos, Plateau State, on Good Friday.

Filmography

References

External links
 
 Nollywood Movie Producer Ifeanyi Onyeabor Dies During Movie Shooting

1971 births
2019 deaths
Nigerian film directors